Extracting the 13th root of a number is a famous category for the mental calculation world records.  The challenge consists of being given a large number (possibly over 100 digits) and asked to return the number that, when taken to the 13th power, equals the given number.  For example, the 13th root of 8,192 is 2 and the 13th root of 96,889,010,407 is 7.

Properties of the challenge

Extracting the 13th root has certain properties.  One is that the 13th root of a number is much smaller:  a 13th root will have approximately 1/13th the number of digits.  Thus, the 13th root of a 100-digit number only has 8 digits and the 13th root of a 200-digit number will have 16 digits.  Furthermore, the last digit of the 13th root is always the same as the last digit of the power.

For the 13th root of a 100-digit number there are 7,992,563 possibilities, in the range 41,246,264 – 49,238,826. This is considered a relatively easy calculation. There are 393,544,396,177,593 possibilities, in the range 2,030,917,620,904,736 – 2,424,462,017,082,328, for the 13th root of a 200-digit number.  This is considered a difficult calculation.

Records

The Guinness Book of World Records has published records for extracting the 13th root of a 100-digit number.  All world records for mentally extracting a 13th root have been for numbers with an integer root:

 The first record was 23 minutes by De Grote (Mexico).
 The most published time was at one time 88.8 seconds by Klein (Netherlands).
 Mittring calculated it in 39 seconds.
 Alexis Lemaire has broken this record with 13.55 seconds. This is the last official world record for extracting the 13th root of a 100-digit number.
 Mittring attempted to break this record with 11.8 seconds, but it was rejected by all organizations (Saxonia Record club, Guinness, 13th root group).
 Lemaire broke this record unofficially 6 times, twice within 4 seconds: the best was 3.625 seconds.
 Lemaire has also set the first world record for the 13th root of a 200-digit number: 513.55 seconds and 742 attempts on April 6, 2005, and broken it with 267.77 seconds and 577 attempts on June 3, 2005.
 The same day, Lemaire has also set in front of official witnesses an unofficial record of 113 seconds and 40 attempts.
 On February 27, 2007, he set a world record of 1 minute and 47 seconds
 He broke this record on July 24, 2007, with a time of 1 minute and 17 seconds (77.99 seconds) at the Museum of History of Science, University of Oxford, UK
 Lemaire broke his record on November 15, 2007, with a time of 72.4 seconds
 Lemaire broke his record on December 10, 2007, with a time of 70.2 seconds

References

Mathematical games